All Me may refer to:
 All Me (album), 2010 album by Toni Gonzaga
 "All Me" (Drake song), 2013
 All Me (Kehlani song), 2019